Melvin Gregorio Rosario (born May 25, 1973 in Santo Domingo, Dominican Republic) is a former Major League Baseball player. Rosario played for the Baltimore Orioles in the 1997 season. In four games, he had no hits in 3 at-bats, with one error at catcher. Rosario was a switch hitter and threw right-handed.

Career
He was signed by the San Diego Padres as an amateur free agent in 1991.

External links

1973 births
Living people
Atlantic City Surf players
Altoona Curve players
Baltimore Orioles players
Birmingham Barons players
Brockton Rox players
Bowie Baysox players
Dominican Republic expatriate baseball players in Italy
Dominican Republic expatriate baseball players in the United States
High Desert Mavericks players
Las Vegas 51s players

Major League Baseball catchers
Major League Baseball players from the Dominican Republic
Oklahoma RedHawks players
Omaha Golden Spikes players
Parma Baseball Club players
Rancho Cucamonga Quakes players
Rochester Red Wings players
South Bend Silver Hawks players
Spokane Indians players
Tucson Sidewinders players
Tulsa Drillers players
Waterloo Diamonds players
Dominican Republic expatriate baseball players in Australia
Perth Heat players